Ulrich Öhlböck (born 10 July 1948) is an Austrian cross-country skier. He competed at the 1968 Winter Olympics and the 1972 Winter Olympics.

References

External links
 

1948 births
Living people
Austrian male cross-country skiers
Austrian male Nordic combined skiers
Olympic cross-country skiers of Austria
Olympic Nordic combined skiers of Austria
Cross-country skiers at the 1972 Winter Olympics
Nordic combined skiers at the 1968 Winter Olympics
Nordic combined skiers at the 1972 Winter Olympics
Sportspeople from Salzburg
20th-century Austrian people